Jaciah Jumilis  (born 23 July 1991) is a Malaysian women's international footballer who plays as a midfielder. She is a member of the Malaysia women's national football team. She was part of the team at the 2015 AFF Women's Championship and 2016 AFF Women's Championship. On club level she played for Sabah FC in Malaysia.

International goals

References

1991 births
Living people
Malaysian women's footballers
Malaysia women's international footballers
Place of birth missing (living people)
Women's association football midfielders
Competitors at the 2017 Southeast Asian Games
Competitors at the 2019 Southeast Asian Games
Southeast Asian Games competitors for Malaysia
20th-century Malaysian women
21st-century Malaysian women